Iris Koh Shu Cii (born: 1976) is a Singaporean anti-vaccination activist. She is the founder of the anti-vaccination activism group Healing the Divide.

Biography
Koh founded the Healing the Divide group to "fill an information gap about COVID-19". In October 2021, Koh and her husband, Raymond Ng, reportedly encouraged over 2,000 members of Healing the Divide to flood several public hotlines, such as the Ministry of Health Quality Service/Feedback hotline, the National Care Hotline and the Ministry of Social and Family Development Hotline. Following this, the police announced that they had begun an investigation on both Koh and Ng for allegedly instigating others to call and overwhelm public hotlines. Koh later apologised for her actions and claimed that she was assisting police with the investigations.

In November 2021, multiple videos from Koh's YouTube channel, where she uploaded various videos surrounding the pandemic and the vaccine, were removed after they were found to have been violating community guidelines. The removal of content from her channel was supported by the Ministry of Health. Following this, Koh decided the sue the government over the removal of her videos, as she believed that it was a violation of her human rights. She was represented by lawyer and activist M Ravi, who was a friend of hers.

In January 2022, the Ministry of Health filed a police report against Koh after she reportedly encouraged members of Healing the Divide to "overwhelm on-site medical staff with questions" at vaccination centres on 27 December 2021.

Collaboration with Dr. Jipson Quah and arrest

Later that month, Koh was found to have been collaborating with Dr. Jipson Quah of the Wan Medical Clinic in Bedok. Quah had been falsifying COVID-19 vaccination records, and allowed patients to submit pre-recorded videos or photos showing them performing a self-administered pre-event antigen rapid test, despite pre-event testing having to occur in real-time and in the presence of a qualified medical practitioner or a qualified self-administered test supervisor. Koh had referred members of Healing the Divide to Quah's clinic. Following this, Koh, Quah, and Quah's assistant Thomas Chua Cheng Soon were arrested. Koh was charged with an offence of the criminal conspiracy to cheat on 23 January 2022. Meanwhile, Quah and Chua were charged with an offence of abetment by conspiracy to cheat. 

However, before her court hearing, which was scheduled to be on 28 January, she was admitted into the Singapore General Hospital. This was confirmed by her lawyer, Clarence Lun. Her admission into hospital was later revealed to have been caused by a pre-existing thyroid condition. During the hearing, her charged was amended to the more serious charge of being party to a criminal conspiracy with Quah. A requested bail to spend Chinese New Year with her family was also rejected on January 31. This came after it was revealed that at least 20 patients were involved in the vaccination fraud. While in remand, Koh tore up a police statement, which resulted in her being given a new charge of obstructing a police inspector by refusing to sign and tearing up a copy of her statement while in remand.

Koh was granted a $20,000 bail on 4 February 2022, and was released. However, as part of the bail conditions, she could not contact, directly or indirectly, co-accused persons, alleged accomplices or any witnesses, including members of the Healing the Divide. Lun believed that the restriction was overly broad as there were over 6,000 members of Healing the Divide. A list of potential witnesses was later provided.

On 15 March 2022, Koh released a Facebook post claiming that she had tested positive for COVID-19 several days after her husband had tested positive, and that she was having mild symptoms. She stated that she believed that since she had contracted the virus, she possessed "immunity for life" from the virus.

On 27 July 2022, Koh was handed an additional 2 charges after new court documents revealed more people had been fraudulently issued certifications of vaccinations as a result of their actions. 

On 16 February 2023, Koh was handed an additional 6 charges: 5 similar to the past charges plus a 6th for instigating one of the members of her group to fabricate evidence in order to be falsely certified to be of unsound mind.

Legal Issues with Lawyers
Following her release, Koh released a 12-minute video on 8 February to raise $100,000, which she claimed would be use in future court proceedings, and to sue Minister of Health Ong Ye Kung and the government for "judicial review". On 15 February 2022, Koh claimed that she had already managed to raise $96,000, and that all of the money would be converted to crypto assets and kept in a crypto wallet as "safeguarding" from the government.

Originally, Koh refused to fully pay her lawyers from Fervent Chambers LLC, claiming she had been overcharged. The Supreme Court of Singapore ordered her to pay her lawyers the balance of the $23,000 owed, described Koh's conduct as “ungracious”. 

On 27 January 2023, Koh's lawyers brought her to court over insolvency charges.

References

1976 births
Singaporean activists
Living people